(You true God and Son of David), is a church cantata by Johann Sebastian Bach. The Sunday was the last occasion for music at church before the quiet time of Lent.

Bach had at least the first three movements ready for the audition in Leipzig and may have added the substantial last movement, derived from the lost Weimarer Passion, rather late. The cantata deals with healing the blind near Jericho. An anonymous author stayed close to the gospel, having the blind man call Jesus in the first movement, and begging Jesus not to pass in the second. In the last movement Bach presents an extended version of "", the German Agnus Dei of the Lutheran mass. He scored the cantata for three vocal soloists, a four-part choir, and a Baroque instrumental ensemble with oboes, strings and continuo.

Bach possibly led the audition performance of the work in Leipzig in the Thomaskirche on 7 February 1723, probably after the sermon. He performed the cantata again for the same occasion on 20 February 1724, this time reinforcing the voices by a brass choir in the final movement.

History and words 
Bach probably composed the cantata in Köthen between 1717 and 1723 for Estomihi (Quinquagesima), the last Sunday before Lent. The prescribed readings for the Sunday were taken from the First Epistle to the Corinthians, "praise of love", and from the Gospel of Luke, healing the blind near Jericho. The authorship of the poetry is unknown. The Sunday was meaningful because it was the last chance to perform cantata music before the quiet time of Lent began.

The chorale theme assigned to "", first appeared in print in Johannes Bugenhagen's Braunschweig church order, published in Wittenberg in 1525. Luther assigned it then to the Kyrie eleison of his Deutsche Messe.

Bach possibly led the audition performance of the work in Leipzig in the Thomaskirche on 7 February 1723, probably after the sermon. It is unclear whether a "test" performance of the 1723 revised version took place in Köthen before Bach's audition. Bach performed the cantata again for the same occasion on 20 February 1724, reinforcing the voices by a brass choir in the final movement. When he performed the cantata again between 1728 and 1731, he returned to the original Köthen key and performed without brass.

Music

Structure and scoring 
Bach structured the cantata in four movements: a duet for soprano (S) and alto (A), a recitative for tenor (T), a chorus, and a closing chorale. He scored it for the three vocal soloists, a four-part choir and a Baroque instrumental ensemble. The duration is given as 20 minutes.

In the following table of the movements, the scoring and keys follow the Neue Bach-Ausgabe for the version performed in 1724, which is in B minor, uses oboes d'amore in the first movement and brass playing colla parte with the voices in the last movement, a choir of cornett (Ct) and three trombones (Tb) (or trumpets (Tr)). According to the Bach scholar Alfred Dürr, the audition version of 1723 had no reinforcement by brass, matching the scoring of the other audition piece. The originally composed version, which was not performed until 1728, was in C minor, had oboes in the opening movement and no brass. The time signatures are taken from the book on all of the cantatas by Dürr, using the symbol for common time (4/4). The continuo, played throughout, is not shown.

Movements 
In this cantata, Bach combines elements of ritornello and concerto writing to expand his range of structural experimentation. Although the closing chorale was a later addition, its melody is incorporated earlier in the piece, unifying the form. The theme of the text is optimistic, but the music throughout has a sense of underlying sadness. Craig Smith describes the cantata as "one of the densest and greatest". The Bach scholar Christoph Wolff notes that the opening duet and also the duet passages on  the chorus are in the style of Bach's secular cantatas written in Köthen.

1 
The opening movement, "" (You true God and Son of David), is "a sinewy and somewhat enigmatic quintet" for soprano and alto voices (assuming the role of the blind man addressing Jesus) with low active oboes and continuo. The movement is in adapted ternary form with an opening and closing "Italianate" ritornello. The soprano line includes a "drooping" motive, hinting at later harmonic and emotional development. There is a "thorny, even awkward juxtaposition of triple and duple meters" throughout the duet.

2 
The tenor recitative, "" (Ah! do not pass by), is similar to that for bass in Jesus nahm zu sich die Zwölfe: they are both in major mode and accompanied by chordal strings underlying the vocal line. This movement adds an instrumental rendition of the melody of the closing chorale in oboe and violin.

3 
The chorus, "" (All eyes wait, Lord), is, according to the musicologist Julian Mincham, "dance-like but not toe-tapping, major but not ebulliently so, employing the full chorus but restrained throughout". The form is a free rondo with interspersed extended episodes of tenor and bass duet. The opening includes the BACH motif.

4 
The last movement, "" (Christ, Lamb of God), is probably older than the first three movements and may have originated in the lost Weimarer Passion from 1717. The three calls of the Agnus Dei are all set differently, with an independent prelude and interludes by the oboes and strings, between the verses. The first verse is marked "adagio". Instrumental motifs are derived from the hymn tune, which appears in the soprano and mostly chordal support by the lower voices. In the second verse, marked "andante", the tune appears in a three-part canon in soprano, oboes and first violin. The third verse returns to B minor. It has the tune in the soprano with polyphony in the lower voices and the instruments. The oboes play a syncopated independent role, while the strings support the voices, and the oboes in the interludes. The complex artful composition is a good preparation for Lent, the time of the Passion. Bach used it again to conclude the second version of his St John Passion in 1725.

Recordings 
The selection is taken from the listing on the Bach Cantatas Website.

Notes

References

External links 
 Du wahrer Gott und Davids Sohn, BWV 23: performance by the Netherlands Bach Society (video and background information)
 
 Du wahrer Gott und Davids Sohn (1st version) BWV 23; BC A 47a / Sacred cantata (Estomihi) Bach Digital
 Du wahrer Gott und Davids Sohn (2nd version) BWV 23; BC A 47b / Sacred cantata (Estomihi) Bach Digital
 Jung Jin Baek: A Conductor's Guide to J. S. Bach's Quinquagesima Cantatas, University of Cincinnati (dissertation), 14 May 2012

Church cantatas by Johann Sebastian Bach
1723 compositions